Arugosin C is an anthraquinone derivative isolated from a species of Aspergillus found in the Red Sea.

References

Heterocyclic compounds with 4 rings
Oxygen heterocycles
Tertiary alcohols
Phenols
Enones